Hugh de Camoys, 2nd Baron Camoys (1413–1426) succeeded his grandfather Thomas de Camoys as Baron in 1419.

The second Baron had no children, so the title went into abeyance between his sisters Margaret and Alianora. The title was called out of abeyance in 1839 for Thomas Stonor, a descendant of Margaret.

References

1413 births
1426 deaths
2